Since the Premier League's formation at the start of the 1992–93 season, 13 players have accrued 500 or more appearances in the Premier League. The first player to reach the milestone was midfielder Gary Speed, in representation of Leeds United, Everton, Newcastle United and Bolton Wanderers; his 500th match was Bolton's 4–0 win over West Ham United on 9 December 2006. Speed held the record for most appearances until 14 February 2009, when goalkeeper David James played his 536th match, for Portsmouth against his former team Manchester City. James ended with 572 appearances, a record which was broken by Ryan Giggs on 14 May 2011, having played all of his matches for Manchester United. On 25 September 2017, Gareth Barry broke Giggs' record by playing his 633rd match, West Bromwich Albion's 2–0 loss at Arsenal. At the time of breaking the record, Barry ranked 8th in English top division appearances since the Second World War, trailing Giggs in 6th (672 total top division appearances) and six other players. Barry is the youngest of the 13 players to have achieved the feat.

Giggs (Manchester United), Steven Gerrard and Jamie Carragher (both Liverpool) are the only three players to have achieved the accolade of 500+ Premier League appearances exclusively for one club. James Milner, Emile Heskey and David James each played for five Premier League clubs (the most for this achievement) on their way to 500+ Premier League games. The only player from outside the United Kingdom to play 500 Premier League games is Australian goalkeeper Mark Schwarzer, for Middlesbrough, Fulham, Chelsea and Leicester City.

List of players

Players are initially listed by number of appearances. If number of appearances are equal, the players are then listed chronologically by the year of first appearance. Current Premier League players and their current clubs are shown in bold.

Statistics are updated as of 12 March 2023.

300 appearances for one club

Since the advent of the Premier league, 41 players have made 300 or more appearances for a single club, with Southampton player James Ward-Prowse the latest to achieve the feat in April 2022. Current Premier League players and their current clubs are shown in bold.

Statistics are updated as of 12 March 2022.

Most appearances by club 
Current Premier League clubs and players who hold the record for the club are shown in bold, defunct clubs are in italics.

See also
List of footballers with 100 or more Premier League goals

References 

Premier League players
 
Association football player non-biographical articles